Xu Chen (born 29 November 1984) is a badminton player from China. In 2010, he (along with his partner Guo Zhendong) was ranked within the top 10 men's badminton doubles in the world.  At the 2012 Summer Olympics, he competed in the mixed doubles with Ma Jin, winning the silver medal.  In the final they lost to Zhang Nan and Zhao Yunlei, also from China. He married a former Chinese national badminton team player, Pan Pan on 3 June 2014.

Achievements

Olympic Games 
Mixed doubles

BWF World Championships 
Men's doubles

Mixed doubles

Asian Games 
Mixed doubles

Asian Championships 
Men's doubles

Mixed doubles

East Asian Games 
Mixed doubles

BWF Superseries 
The BWF Superseries, which was launched on 14 December 2006 and implemented in 2007, is a series of elite badminton tournaments, sanctioned by the Badminton World Federation (BWF). BWF Superseries levels are Superseries and Superseries Premier. A season of Superseries consists of twelve tournaments around the world that have been introduced since 2011. Successful players are invited to the Superseries Finals, which are held at the end of each year.

Men's doubles

Mixed doubles

  BWF Superseries Finals tournament
  BWF Superseries Premier tournament
  BWF Superseries tournament

BWF Grand Prix 
The BWF Grand Prix had two levels, the BWF Grand Prix and Grand Prix Gold. It was a series of badminton tournaments sanctioned by the Badminton World Federation (BWF) which was held from 2007 to 2017. The World Badminton Grand Prix sanctioned by International Badminton Federation (IBF) from 1983 to 2006.

Mixed doubles

  BWF Grand Prix Gold tournament
  BWF & IBF Grand Prix tournament

References

External links 

 
 
 
 

1984 births
Living people
Sportspeople from Nanjing
Badminton players from Jiangsu
World No. 1 badminton players
Chinese male badminton players
Olympic badminton players of China
Badminton players at the 2012 Summer Olympics
Badminton players at the 2016 Summer Olympics
Olympic silver medalists for China
Olympic medalists in badminton
Medalists at the 2012 Summer Olympics
Badminton players at the 2010 Asian Games
Badminton players at the 2014 Asian Games
Asian Games medalists in badminton
Asian Games gold medalists for China
Asian Games silver medalists for China
Asian Games bronze medalists for China
Medalists at the 2010 Asian Games
Medalists at the 2014 Asian Games
Universiade medalists in badminton
Universiade silver medalists for China
Medalists at the 2007 Summer Universiade